Michael Freeden is a Professor at the Department of Politics and International Studies at the School of Oriental and African Studies, University of London. He is also Emeritus Professorial Fellow at Mansfield College, Oxford. Between 2013 and 2015, he was Professor of Political Theory in the School of Politics and International Relations at the University of Nottingham. He is a leading theorist of ideology and the founding editor of the Journal of Political Ideologies.

Study of ideologies

Freeden has been noted for his analysis of contemporary ideologies. He has rejected the traditional definition of ideologies, which sees the latter as static "belief systems" and instead bases his analysis on modern semantics. Just like languages, ideologies consist of certain concepts whose meaning may change and evolve over time. The specific relations between ideological concepts may be analyzed by being set in their respective semantic fields.

Each ideology may be seen as having both "core" concepts (that is, those of the highest importance, e.g. class conflict in Marxism or freedom in liberalism) and "peripheral" (or secondary) concepts. Concepts may gain or lose importance over time, just as new concepts may emerge (or be borrowed from other ideologies) or fall out of use entirely. Different ideologies may give different meanings to the same term (a concept such as equality will have a material definition in Marxism while in liberalism it will rather have a legal and political importance). In this sense, concepts are defined by their relation to other concepts. According to Freeden, it is precisely these conceptual relations that should attract our attention as they will be likely to evolve in the long term.

By studying the conceptual evolution of ideologies, Freeden observes that the relative "political success" of an ideology depends on its ability to impose the belief that its own conceptual definitions are the "correct ones". This gives rise to a form of "conceptual competition", in which each ideology performs a continuous "decontestation" of its concepts; that is, it tries to eliminate all possible contestation of its own conceptual definitions, thereby rejecting competing definitions (Marxism will thus reject private property as a product of the exploitative nature of capitalism, just as liberalism may view state intervention as an infringement of individual freedoms).

This decontestation is not only the product of an inter-ideological competition (between ideologies), but it is also the product of an intra-ideological competition (within ideologies): hence the success of Friedrich Hayek's form of neoliberalism during the 1980s, or of the Marxist–Leninist trend in the 1920s.

Works

 The New Liberalism: An Ideology of Social Reform (Oxford, 1978)
 Liberalism Divided: A Study in British Political Thought 1914-1939 (Oxford, 1986)
 J.A. Hobson: A Reader (London, 1988)
 Minutes of the Rainbow Circle 1894–1924, edited and annotated (London, 1989)
 Reappraising J.A. Hobson: Humanism and Welfare (ed.) (London, 1990)
 Rights (Buckingham, 1991)
 Ideologies and Political Theory: A Conceptual Approach (Oxford, 1998)
 Reassessing Political Ideologies: The Durability of Dissent (ed.) (London, 2001)
 Ideology: A Very Short Introduction (Oxford, 2003)
 Liberal Languages: Ideological Imaginations and Twentieth Century Progressive Thought (Princeton, 2005) 
 Taking Ideology Seriously: 21st Century Reconfigurations (co-editor with G. Talshir and M. Humphrey) (London, 2006)
 The Political Theory of Political Thinking: The Anatomy of a Practice (Oxford, 2013)
 Liberalism: A Very Short Introduction (Oxford, 2015)

References

External links
 Freeden biography in Oxford Staff Directory
 Interview of Michael Freeden by Sami Syrjämäki

Living people
British political scientists
Year of birth missing (living people)
Fellows of Mansfield College, Oxford